Interferon-induced transmembrane protein 2 is a protein that in humans is encoded by the IFITM2 gene. IFITM1 is a member of the IFITM family (Interferon-induced transmembrane protein) which is encoded by IFITM genes. 

As the name implies, these genes are induced by interferon and form part of its signaling pathway. In the absence of interferon stimulation, IFITM proteins can express broadly in tissues and cell lines. In humans, IFITM1, IFITM2 and IFITM3 are able to express in different tissues and cells while the expression of IFITM5 is limited to osteoblasts.

Antiviral function 

IFITM proteins have been identified as antiviral restriction factors that block the early stages of viral replication. They inhibit influenza A virus replication, and infection with a wide range of other enveloped viruses

References

Further reading 

Genes
Human proteins